Corporación Multi Inversiones (CMI; Spanish for Multi Investment Corporation) is a multinational agro-industrial corporation based in Guatemala. The firm was founded as a family business by Juan Bautista Gutiérrez in the 1920s.

CMI invests, provides employment and contributes to the development of the region. It started operations in Guatemala and Central America, and grew to become one of the most important business groups in Latin America. It is currently led by Juan Luis Bosch Gutiérrez and Juan José Gutiérrez Mayorga, joint Presidents-Chairmen.

CMI works in two major business sectors: Food and Capital, with interests in different areas. In the food sector, CMI is in the wheat and corn flour mill, pasta and cookie production businesses; in poultry, pork, processed and sausage manufacturing industries; in balanced food for animals and pets; in the restaurant industry with its “Pollo Campero” brand, among others. In the Capital sector, CMI has renewable energy generation projects, real estate project development and financial services.

Currently, CMI Guatemala has more than 40,000 employees, working in 15 different countries of two continents.

Business units 

 B4B

As one of the largest milling groups in Latin America, it engages in the development of the wheat and other cereal value chains with the production of wheat and corn flour, [8] as well as the production of balanced food for animals. [9]

 Livestock Industry

In the poultry and pork industries, it develops meat food solutions, with a growing innovation process in Guatemala, El Salvador, Honduras and Costa Rica.

 Consumer and Packaged Goods

The Strategic Consumer and Packaged Goods Unit oversees the production and marketing of pasta, cookies, sauces and other consumer products.

 Restaurants in Central America

It is currently the largest Latin American restaurant chain in the world, with presence in the United States and Europe, with its brands “Pollo Campero”, “Pollo Granjero” and "Don Pollo”.

 “Campero USA”

The growth of “Pollo Campero” led, in 2012, to the creation of the “Campero USA” business unit that serves its own operations and franchises in the United States and Europe. Today it has more than 80 restaurants in the United States.[10]

 Energy

CMI has one of the largest regional platforms in the renewable energy sector including hydro, wind and solar energy, ranking among the top three generators in the region.

 Multi Proyectos

It is one of the leading developers of real estate projects, housing complexes, shopping centers, office buildings and innovative projects with high quality standards. [7]

 Finances

It provides financial services for all CMI companies through financing, investment management, insurance and other financial services. This unit serves the commercial, industrial, agricultural, service and financial sectors, individuals, housing, energy and construction endeavors.

CMI’S history 
CMI’s history begins with a small store located in San Cristóbal, Totonicapán, Guatemala in 1920.

In 1936, “Molino Excelsior” was established in Quetzaltenango by Juan Bautista Gutiérrez, starting the Corporation's milling industry.

In 1964, the Villalobos Poultry Farm was established, and was the starting point for CMI’s poultry operations in Guatemala. Seven years later, “Pollo Campero” was born, a company that today is a major part of the Central America Restaurant Business Unit. A year later, the Corporation began expanding its poultry and restaurant operations to El Salvador and the rest of Central America. In this same decade, the social branch of Corporación Multi Inversiones, the Juan Bautista Gutiérrez Foundation, was created.

In 1988, CMI began its operations in construction, with the development of real estate and housing projects, shopping centers and office complexes in several areas of Guatemala. 6 years after construction operations began, the “Pollo Campero” franchise program was launched. In this same decade, the Finance Business Unit was created to meet the financing needs of the Corporation's companies. 6 years later, the expansion to Central America and the Dominican Republic continued with poultry and milling operations.

The Corporation contributes to its CSR objectives through its business units in two business sectors: CMI Food and CMI Capital, by promoting various projects, consistent with the company’s comprehensive and full-sustainability vision.

Milestones 

 In 2002, the “Pollo Campero” franchise concept was launched in the United States.
 In 2004 the operations of the Corporation's Energy Business Unit began.
 In 2006 “Pollo Campero” began expanding to the United States, Europe and Asia.
 In 2013, a flour mill dedicated mainly to produce wheat flour was acquired in southern Mexico.
 In 2013, CMI participated actively in the telecom business by acquiring “Telefonía Movistar” in Nicaragua and Panama.
 In 2015, the Gemina wheat flour mill was acquired in Chinandega, Nicaragua.
 In 2016, CMI Guatemaña acquired one of the most important regional platforms in the renewable energy sector with wind and solar energy projects.
 In 2017, the first 5-star hotel opened in Quetzaltenango: Latam Hotel Plaza Pradera Quetzaltenango.
 In 2017, CMI acquired interest in Pronaca in Ecuador, a food processor for poultry, pork and animal food. AES El Salvador and CMI are investing $160 million in “Proyecto Bósforo” which includes 10 solar plants that will generate 100 megawatts.
 In 2018, The Renace Hydroelectric Complex received the international award "Diversified Corporate Social Responsibility Program" from Standard & Poor's Global Platts.
 In 2019, Multi-Proyectos and Tecún Group invested US $53 million in the construction of the New Pradera shopping center in Vistares.
 In 2019, Multi-Proyectos opened a new shopping center in Zacapa with an investment of more than US $16 million.
 In 2019, it made a significant investment in Toledano, a leader in the poultry industry in Panama, through La Estancia, an investment and strategic management platform formed by the Bakker and Gutiérrez families. They generate value through the acquisition and transformation of leading animal protein companies of the Andean region and in Panama.

In 2021, FORBES Magazine dedicated its February issue to CMI for its 100th anniversary.

Social Initiatives 
CMI Guatemala is committed to the sustainable development of the region, and invests time and resources to create programs to contribute to this aim.

The CSR programs and projects carried out by CMI seek to be in close contact with the reality of the countries where they operate, to understand the needs of the population and develop initiatives to help meet those needs.

The Corporation carries out initiatives to break the vicious circle of poverty and promote better living conditions for people, by fostering development in the short, medium and long terms.

Through its business units, CMI contributes to its CSR objectives by promoting projects in the following focus areas:

 CMI Undertakes. This is a social initiative that supports dreamers, hard-working people who want to establish their own business, by promoting entrepreneurship and formal set-ups in projects that create and enhance opportunities for entrepreneurs such as: Casa de Pollo Rey, El Rincón del Pollo, Pollolandia and Cedecap (the latter is dedicated to train people seeking to start their own bakery and pastry business). With CMI Undertakes, people can become owners of their business, and can work in partnership with CMI brands and products, and create development and prosperity
 CMI Educates. This social initiative offers opportunities for personal development, and works to build an environment of respect in the community; it looks for opportunities for young people, gives them empowering tools and works with integrity. This is accomplished through different programs such as university-level scholarships, food and study scholarships, improvement of school infrastructure, nurseries in communities, partnerships with universities and training centers.
 CMI Stands by you. This social initiative is committed to the improvement of our environment and reality by generating personal development opportunities for company employees, as well as by supporting their communities, with programs that provide access to safe drinking water, medical services, reforestation and road construction, among others, thus, proposing solutions to regional problems.
 Juan Bautista Gutiérrez Foundation. Is the social branch of CMI established in 1985. It formalizes the philanthropic projects of the Bosch Gutiérrez and Gutiérrez Mayorga families. The education and health programs of each of the Corporation's companies are channeled and centralized through this Foundation. It seeks to improve the living conditions of the most vulnerable people, such as chronically malnourished girls and boys, pregnant women, and lactating women, help prevent early pregnancies and provide university opportunities for low-income young people.

References

External links
CMI web site(English language)

Companies of Guatemala
Multinational companies